Dubois (also spelled DuBois or Du Bois, from the French of the woods/forest) is a surname. Notable people with the surname include:

Clergy
Florent du Bois de La Villerabel (1877-1951), French archbishop
Guillaume Dubois (1656–1723), French cardinal and statesman
Jean-Antoine Dubois (1765–1848), French Catholic missionary in India
John Dubois (1764–1842), also Jean, French Catholic missionary in Virginia and Appalachians, third bishop of New York
Louis-Ernest Dubois (1856–1929), Roman Catholic cardinal and Archbishop of Paris

Composers
Alexandra du Bois (born 1981), American composer
Charles-Victor Dubois (1832–1869), Belgian composer and harmonium player
Pierre-Max Dubois (1930–1995), classical composer
R. Luke DuBois, American composer and visual artist
Théodore Dubois (1837–1924), French organist, composer, and musical administrator

Military people
Adolphe DuBois d'Aische (1874-1958), Belgian World War I flying ace
Jean Dubois de Gennes (1895-1929), French World War I flying ace
Lewis DuBois, American Revolutionary War commander
Paul-Alexis Dubois (1754–1796), French general of the French Revolutionary Wars
Pierre Joseph Dubois (1852-1924), French World War I general
Raymond F. DuBois (born 1947), American private defense consultant 
Toussaint Dubois (1762-1816), French-American soldier

Painters and sculptors
Albert Dubois-Pillet (1846-1890), French Neo-impressionist painter and career army officer
Ambroise Dubois (1542/43–1614/15), Flemish-born French painter
Émile Fernand-Dubois (1869–1952), Belgian-French sculptor and medalist
Ernest Henri Dubois (1863-1930), French sculptor
François Dubois (19th century) (1790–1871), neoclassical French painter
François Dubois (1529–1584), Huguenot French painter
Frederic Dubois (c. 1760 - c. 1822), French miniature painter and painter
Georges Dubois (sculptor) (1865 - 1934), French sculptor
Gérard DuBois (born 1968), French illustrator
Guillam Dubois (1623–1661), Dutch Golden Age landscape painter
Guy Pène du Bois (1884-1958), 20th-century American painter, art critic, and educator
Jean Dubois the Elder (1604–1679), French landscape painter
Jess E. DuBois {1934-2022), American painter
Louis Dubois (painter) (1830–1880), Belgian painter
Paul Dubois (sculptor) (1829–1905), French sculptor and painter
Paul Élie Dubois (1886-1949), French Orientalist painter
Pierre-Gilles Dubois (1938–1995), Canadian sculptor and painter

Performers
Arthur Dubois (c. 1946–2022), American hip-hop artist and music producer
Candy Dubois (1934–1995), Chilean dancer
Charles-Hippolyte Dubois-Davesnes (1800-1874),  19th-century French playwright, actor, theatre director and theatre manager
Claude Dubois (born 1947), Canadian singer-songwriter
Cyrille Dubois (born 1984), French opera and lieder singer
Dallas DuBois (born 1986), American actor and drag queen
 Emmanuel Dubois (born 1984), Canadian rapper
Ja'Net DuBois (1932–2020), American actress and singer
Jerome Xavier DuBois, Canadian-born Taiwanese mandopop singer and songwriter
Marie Dubois (1937-2014), French actress
Marta DuBois (1952-2018), Panamanian-American actress
Michel Dubois (1937-2021), French theatre director and actor
Micke Dubois (1959-2005), Swedish actor and comedian
Nikola Dubois (born 1977), Australian actress
Olivier Dubois (born 1972), French choreographer
Samantha Dubois (1955-1992), Dutch-born radio presenter
Victoire Du Bois (born 1988/1989), French actress

Politicians
Benjamin F. DuBois (1915-2013), American politician
Claude Dubois (politician) (born 1931), Canadian politician
Daniel Dubois (politician) (born 1952), French politician
Edmond Louis Alexis Dubois-Crancé (1747-1814), French Revolutionary
Émile Dubois (1913–1973), French politician
Émile-Jules Dubois (1853-1904), French doctor and politician
Florent Dubois (1906-1987), Canadian politician
Francis Dubois (born 1961), French politician
Françoise Dubois (born 1947), French politician
Fred Dubois (1851–1930), U.S. Senator
Jacqueline Dubois (born 1957), French politician
Jean-Guy Dubois (born 1948), Canadian politician, lawyer and academic
Jean-Michel Dubois (born 1943), French politician
Jean-Pierre Dubois (born 1952), French leftist activist and lawyer
Jesse K. Dubois (1811–1876), American politician
Louis Dubois (politician) (1859–1946), French Minister of Commerce, Industry, Posts, and Telegraphs
Louis Victor Dubois (1837-1914), French politician
Lucien Dubois (1893-1948), Canadian politician and farmer
Marianne Dubois (born 1957), French politician
Mark Dubois (born 1949), American environmental activist
Michelle DuBois, American politician
Stephen Dubois (born 1940), Australian politician
William H. Dubois (1835-1907), American businessman and political figure

Scientists
Alphonse Dubois (1839-1921), Belgian naturalist 
Anna Dubois (born 1962), Swedish organizational theorist
Charles Frédéric Dubois (1804–1867), Belgian naturalist
Cora Du Bois (1903-1991), American cultural anthropologist
Didier Dubois (mathematician) (born 1952), French mathematician
Ellen DuBois (born 1947), American feminist historian 
Eugène Dubois (1858–1940), Dutch anthropologist
Frédéric Dubois d'Amiens (1799-1873), French physician and historian of medicine
Jacques Dubois (literary theorist) (born 1933), Belgian literary theorist and critic
Jacques Dubois (1478-1555),  French anatomist
Jacques-Émile Dubois (1920-2005), French chemist
Jean Dubois (linguist) (1920–2015), French linguist
Laurent Dubois, American historian
Marcel Dubois (1856-1916), French geographer
Marcel-Jacques Dubois (1920–2007), French theologian
Page DuBois, American classicist
Paul Antoine Dubois (1795-1871), French obstetrician
Paul Charles Dubois (1848–1918), Swiss neuropathologist
Raphaël Dubois (1849-1929), French pharmacologist
W. E. B. Du Bois (1868–1963), American sociologist, historian, civil rights activist and author

Sportspeople
Adrian Dubois (born 1987), American soccer player
Albane Dubois (born 1992), French sailor
Alice Dubois (born 1970), French judoka
Arnaud Dubois (born 1986), Belgian racing cyclist
Brian Dubois (born 1967), American baseball player
Caroline Dubois (boxer) (born 2001), British boxer
Catherine Dubois (born 1995), Canadian ice hockey player
Daniel Dubois (boxer) (born 1997), British boxer
Didier Dubois (athlete) (born 1957), French sprinter
Édouard Dubois (born 1989), French professional golfer
Émile Dubois (cyclist), French cyclist
Gabriel Dubois (1911-1985), French racing cyclist
Georges Dubois (gymnast), French gymnast
Georges Dubois (hurdler) (died 1934), French hurdler
Georges Dubois (skier) (born 1935), Swiss skier
Guy Dubois (born 1950), Swiss ice hockey player
Iván Dubois (born 1995), Argentine professional footballer
Jason Dubois (born 1979), American baseball player
Jean Dubois (canoeist) (1914–?), Belgian sprint canoeist
Jean Dubois (field hockey) (1926–2021), Belgian field hockey player
Joe Dubois (1927–1987), Northern Irish footballer
Léo Dubois (born 1994), French professional footballer
Marcel Dubois (wrestler) (1886-1955), Belgian wrestler
Marco Dubois (born 1995), Canadian football player
Marie-Françoise Dubois (born 1948), French athlete
Michel Dubois (ice hockey) (born 1954), Canadian professional ice hockey player
Pascal Dubois (born 1962), French road cyclist
Pierre-Luc Dubois (born 1998), Canadian professional ice hockey player
Raúl Dubois (born 1959), Cuban basketball player
René Dubois (1906-?), French boxer
Serafino Dubois (1817-1899), Italian chess Master and chess writer
Serge Dubois (born 1954), Belgian field hockey player
Stéphanie Dubois (born 1986), Canadian tennis player
Theo Dubois (1911-2011), Belgian-Canadian rower
Thierry Dubois (born 1967), French sailor
Victor Dubois, French gymnast

Writers
Brendan DuBois (born 1959), American mystery writer
Caroline Dubois (poet) (born 1960), French poet
Constance Goddard DuBois (died 1934), American novelist and an ethnographer
Edward Dubois (1774-1850), English wit and man of letters
Guillaume Crétin (or Dubois) (c. 1460-1525), French poet
Jean-Paul Dubois (born 1950), French journalist and author
Joseph-Gaspard Dubois-Fontanelle (1727-1812), French journalist, man of letters, playwright and translator
Jules Dubois (1910-1966), American journalist
Philippe Goibaut (known also as Monsieur Du Bois) (1629-1694), French writer and translator
Pierre Dubois (author) (born 1945), French author, comics scriptwriter, storyteller and lecturer
Pierre Dubois (scholastic) (c. 1255 – after 1321), French scholastic and writer
Pierre H. Dubois (1917-1999), Dutch writer and critic
Pye Dubois, Canadian lyricist and poet
René-Daniel Dubois (born 1955), Québécois playwright and actor
Shirley Graham Du Bois (1896–1977), American author, playwright, composer, and activist
Sieur Dubois, pseudonymous author of 1674 travel book
Tim DuBois (born 1948), American country songwriter
William Pène du Bois (1916–1993), author and illustrator

Others
Allison DuBois (born 1972), research spiritual medium and inspiration for the TV show Medium
Antoine Dubois (1756–1837), French surgeon
Ed Dubois (1952-2016), British yacht designer
Émile Dubois (murderer) (1867-1907), French-born Chilean criminal, serial killer and folk hero
Félix Dubois (1862–1945), French journalist, explorer and speculator
Gérard Dubois (chef), Swiss-born chef
Jan E. DuBois (born 1931), American judge
Joshua DuBois (born 1982), head of the Office of Faith Based and Neighborhood Partnerships under President Obama
Josué Dubois Berthelot de Beaucours (ca 1662-1750), French-Canadian military officer, chief engineer and governor
Léon-Jean-Joseph Dubois (1780-1846), French illustrator, lithographer, archaeologist and curator at the Louvre museum
Louis DuBois (Huguenot) (died 1696), Huguenot colonist in New Netherland 
Macy DuBois (1929–2007), Canadian architect
Paul Dubois (diplomat) (born 1943), Canadian diplomat
Stanisław Dubois (1901-1942), Polish journalist and political activist
Sylvia Dubois (c. 1788/89-1888), African-American woman born into slavery who became free after striking her slave mistress
Urbain Dubois (1818–1901), French chef
William Dubois (architect) (1879-1953), American architect
Yolande Du Bois (1900-1961), American teacher, associated with the Harlem Renaissance

Fictional characters
Artemis Dubois, a character in the FXX Series It's Always Sunny in Philadelphia
Blanche DuBois, one of the female leads in A Streetcar Named Desire
Capitane Chantel DuBois, the main antagonist of Madagascar 3: Europe's Most Wanted
Didier Dubois, a fictitious character in Driv3r
Harry DuBois, the main character of Disco Elysium
Helen Dubois, a character in Drake and Josh
Hubie Dubois, a character from the Adam Sandler movie Hubie Halloween
Shriek DuBois, a character in the Nickelodeon animated series CatDog
The Dubois Family, friends of the main characters in The Boondocks
Laurel Dubois, the late biological mother of protagonist Randal Person in This Is Us

See also
 Dubos, a French surname
 DuBose (disambiguation)

French-language surnames
French toponymic surnames